Mike Mosley (December 13, 1946 in Oklahoma City, Oklahoma – March 3, 1984 in Aguanga, California) was an American race car driver in the USAC and CART Championship Car series. He raced in 17 consecutive seasons from 1967 through 1983, with 166 combined career starts, including every Indianapolis 500 in that span except 1967 and 1982.  He finished in the top ten 80 times and had 5 career victories.

Career
Mosley was known for a "charger" driving style and for his smooth driving technique. Many of his peers felt Mosley never had the opportunity to showcase his talent due to second-rate equipment. Longtime motorsports writer Robin Miller quoted Gary Bettenhausen, a close friend and contemporary of Mosley, as saying: "If Mike had been driving a McLaren (Indianapolis car) in the early 1970s, we would all have been racing for second place."

Mosley was known for having a perceived "jinx" at Indianapolis. He qualified near the front several times, including second in 1981 and 1983, and was often a pre-race favorite. However, in 15 starts, he finished the 500 miles only once—a third-place result in 1979. On his first visit to Indianapolis in 1967, he lied about his age (20 at the time) to gain entry; after two crashes in practice, he told the car owner he was not yet ready to tackle Indy's 2 1/2-mile oval. The next year, he returned and qualified for the race.

Mosley was particularly effective at the flat Milwaukee Mile paved oval, where he used an unusual driving line and recorded three victories.  In the 1981 race there, added as a promoter's option, he came from the back of the field to win the race. It was the last win for a normally-aspirated engine in the CART/Champ Car era and also the last win in open wheel racing for a Gurney Eagle.

Mosley died in a highway accident in Aguanga, California. He lost control of the truck he was driving, which rolled down an embankment and caught fire. His teenaged son, Michael, was also riding in the van but was uninjured.

Racing Results

Indianapolis 500 results

USAC Champ Car results
(key) (Races in bold indicate pole position)

CART IndyCar Series Results
(key)

International Race of Champions results
(key) (Bold – Pole position. * – Most laps led.)

References

1946 births
1984 deaths
Champ Car drivers
Indianapolis 500 drivers
International Race of Champions drivers
Sportspeople from Oklahoma City
Racing drivers from Oklahoma
Racing drivers from Oklahoma City
Road incident deaths in California
USAC Silver Crown Series drivers